Trịnh Linh Giang (born 3 August 1997) is a Vietnamese tennis player.

Trịnh has a career high ATP singles ranking of 1176 achieved on 14 November 2022.

Trịnh represents Vietnam at the Davis Cup, where he has a W/L record of 4–0.

External links

1997 births
Living people
Vietnamese male tennis players
Sportspeople from Hanoi
Tennis players at the 2018 Asian Games
Asian Games competitors for Vietnam
Competitors at the 2021 Southeast Asian Games
Southeast Asian Games silver medalists for Vietnam
Southeast Asian Games bronze medalists for Vietnam
Southeast Asian Games medalists in tennis
21st-century Vietnamese people